The 1988 Arena Football League season was the second season of the Arena Football League. The league champions were the Detroit Drive, who defeated the Chicago Bruisers in ArenaBowl II.

Standings

y – clinched regular-season title

x – clinched playoff spot

Playoffs

Awards and honors

Regular season awards

All-Arena team

Team notes

External links